La Hire may refer to:

People
La Hire, Étienne de Vignolles dit La Hire (1390—1443) 
Jean de La Hire (1878—1956) pseudonym of Adolphe d'Espie de La Hire, French author
Phillipe de la Hire (1640—1718) French astronomer and mathematician

Other:
Mons La Hire, a lunar feature named for Philippe de la Hire.
 Lahire, in French the name for the Jack of hearts, named for Étienne de Vignolles